Merca is a historic port city in the southern Lower Shebelle province of Somalia. Merca is the traditional home territory of the Major Bimal clan and was the center of the Bimal revolt.

History

Antiquity
The city of Essina is believed to have been the predecessor state of Merca. It used to be an ancient Proto-Somali emporium city-state. It is mentioned in the Periplus of the Erythraean Sea, a Greek travel document dating from the first century AD, as one of a series of commercial ports on the Somali littoral. According to the Periplus, maritime trade already connected peoples in the Merca area with other communities along the Somali Sea coast.

Medieval Period

According to the 12th-century author Al-Idrisi the Hawiye occupied the coastal areas between Ras Hafun and Merca, as well as the lower basin of the lower Shabelle river. Al-Idrisi's mention of the Hawiye is the first documentary reference to a specific Somali group in the Horn. Later Arab writers also make references to the Hawiye clan in connection with both Merca and the lower Shabelle valley. Ibn Sa'id (1214–74), for instance, considered Merca to be the capital of the Hawiye, who lived in fifty villages on the bank of a river which he called the Nile of Mogadishu, a clear reference to the Shabelle river. Yaqut al-Hamawi, another thirteen-century Arab geographer also mentions Merca, which he says belonged to the Black Berbers considered ancestors of modern Somalis.

During the Middle Ages, the area was one of several prominent administrative centers of the Ajuran Sultanate. The polity formed one of the largest kingdoms in the  Horn region. Various pillar tombs exist in the region, which local tradition holds were built in the 15th century when the Sultanate's naa'ibs governed the district. According to Ibn Sa'id in the thirteenth century described nearby Merca as one of the three most important cities on the East African coast along with Mogadishu and Barawa all serving as the commercial and Islamic centers for the Indian Ocean.

Following the decline of Ajuran Sultanate. In the vicinity of Merca, a mysterious group known as the El Amir made its appearance between 1650 and 1700. According to an account collected by Guillain in 1847, a leader known as Amir, believed to originate from the Abgaal, formed a following or "tribe" which invaded the territory of Merca and expelled the Ajuran clan. The El Amir ruled for thirty-four years until the Biimaal expelled them and definitively occupied Merca.

Early Modern
One of the most powerful sultanates to have emerged from Southern Somalia called the Geledi Sultanate centered in Afgooye in the late 17th century. It incorporated the Merca territory into its kingdom until the Bimaal rebelled in the mid-1800s for independence. The Sultanate of Geledi tried to attack and destroy the Bimaal clan many times to try and re-capture the coastal city of Merca. But the Bimal of Merca managed to defeat the Geledi Sultanate 2 times. In 1843 Yusuf Mahamud, the Sultan of Geledi, vowed to destroy the Bimaal once and for all and mobilizes the Geledi army. In 1848 the sultan of the Geledi, Yusuf Mahamud was killed at Adaddey Suleyman, a village near Merca, in a battle between the Bimaal and Geledi Sultanates. His son Sultan Ahmed Yusuf tried to seek revenge but was also killed in 1878 at Agaaran, near Marka by the Bimal. This caused a steady decline in the Geledi Sultanate.

Bimal Revolt 
The Bimal revolt, Bimal resistance, or Banadir resistance was a guerrilla war against the Italian Somaliland in southern Somalia. It was fought from the years 1896 to 1926 and largely concentrated in the Lower Shebelle, Banadir, and Middle Shebelle. The war was centered around Merka and Danane.

It is compared to the war of the Mad Mullah in northern Somalia. Named after the Bimal clan since they were the major element in the resistance.

For more about Bimal or Merca revolt see:

Modern
In the 1930s a group of Italian Somalis established residency in Merca. The Port of Merca was the oldest port in Italian Somalia and was nicknamed the "port of bananas" due to its status as a key exporter of bananas from Somalia to Europe. In the city of Merca there was a huge economic development in the 1930s, due mainly to the growing commerce of the port of Merca connected by small railway to the farm area of Genale.

Merca was abandoned by government forces and captured by Al-Shabaab in February 2016. It was recaptured by the Somali National Army along with African Union troops, a few days later. A small battle was fought in which a Somali soldier, several militants, and four civilians died.

On 27 July 2022, an Al-Shabaab suicide bomber killed mayor Abdullahi Ali Ahmed Waafow and twenty other people while Waafow was giving a speech.

Demographics
According to the UNDP in 2005, Merca had a population of around 63,900 inhabitants. 
it is primarily inhabited by 12 koofi and mashayikh tribes with there being a recognizable amount of Somalis.

Transportation 
Merca has a jetty-class seaport, the Port of Merca.

The nearest airport to the city is the K50 Airport in the Lower Shebelle province.

Notable people
Asha Jama, social activist, and former TV reporter and journalist.
Sheikh Abibakar Gafle, described as one of the best-known resistance leaders in Southern Somalia and from Merca.
Ali Maow Maalin, the last person known to have been naturally infected by Variola minor smallpox
Abdullahi Ali Ahmed Waafow, former mayor of Merca and Member of Parliament

See also
Port of Merca
Mogadishu
Barawa

References

External links
Marka, Somalia

Ajuran Sultanate
Populated places in Lower Shebelle
Populated coastal places in Somalia